In Uzbekistan, secondary education is divided into two stages. The first stage includes nine years of compulsory schooling with the same programs all over Uzbekistan. The second stage covers education and vocational training after nine years. It includes general secondary education and specialized secondary education. Young people receive general secondary education while staying in school for the tenth and eleventh grades. Upon successful completion, they get a Certificate of Complete Secondary Education.

Specialized secondary education is provided through a network of schools:
 Professionalno-Tehnicheskoye Uchilishe (PTU or Professional Technical School). Graduates receive a Junior Specialist Diploma equal to a Certificate of Complete Secondary Education.
 Tehnikum (Technical College). Graduates receive a Junior Specialist Diploma equal to a Certificate of Complete Secondary Education.
 Lytsei (Lyceum) or various training courses offered by higher education institutions or industry. Graduates receive a Junior Specialist Diploma or Diploma of Academic Lyceum equal to a Certificate of Complete Secondary Education.

In 2017, education reforms in Uzbekistan changed from 12-year program to 11 years after a previous reform disappointed and troubled parents and children. Eleven years of primary and secondary education are obligatory, starting at age seven. The rate of attendance in those grades is high, although the figure is significantly lower in rural areas than in urban centers. Preschool registration has decreased significantly since 1991.

The official literacy rate is 99 percent. However, in the post-Soviet era educational standards have fallen. Funding and training have not been sufficient to effectively educate the expanding younger cohorts of the population. Between 1992 and 2004, government spending on education dropped from 12 percent to 6.3 percent of gross domestic product.  
In 2006 education’s share of the budget increased to 8.1 percent. Lack of budgetary support has been more noticeable at the primary and secondary levels, as the government has continued to subsidize university students.

Between 1992 and 2001, university attendance dropped from 19 percent of the college-age population to 6.4 percent. The three largest of Uzbekistan’s 63 institutions of higher learning are in Nukus, Samarkand, and Tashkent, with all three being state funded.

Private schools are forbidden as a result of a government crackdown on the establishment of Islamic fundamentalist (Wahhabi) schools. However, in 1999 the government-supported Tashkent Islamic University was founded for the teaching of Islam.

Among higher educational institutions, the highest rated at domestic level are Tashkent Financial Institute and Westminster International University in Tashkent. The first one was established by the initiative of the first president of Uzbekistan in 1991. Later in 2002, in collaboration with the University of Westminster (UK) and “UMID” Foundation of the President of the Republic of Uzbekistan, Westminster International University in Tashkent was established. Currently these universities are regarded as the best in its sphere of education both in Uzbekistan and Central Asian countries.

In 2007, Uzbekistan Banking Association (UBA) had a joint venture with Management Development Institute of Singapore, Singapore and set up MDIST university in Tashkent.

In 2009, Turin Polytechnic University in Tashkent was established from the collaboration among Polytechnic University of Turin, UZAVTOSANOAT, and the Uzbek Ministry of Higher Education. TTPU offers bachelor's programs in Mechanical and Aerospace Engineering, Civil Engineering and Architecture and Computer Engineering.

In 2010 the British School of Tashkent was established to provide a high-achieving British school where children learn in a secure and stimulating environment and children of all nationalities are exposed to the English National Curriculum. The school is also able to deliver all local Uzbek curriculum requirements.

Higher private and entrepreneurial education is developing in Uzbekistan. In 2020 TEAM University was established as private entrepreneurial university by the Resolution of the Cabinet of Ministers of the Republic of Uzbekistan No. 241 dated April 18, 2020. TEAM University operates under license No. OT 0007.

References

2.https://education.stateuniversity.com/pages/1652/Uzbekistan-SECONDARY-EDUCATION.html